R. Vasudevan was an Indian civil servant, and served as special secretary to the Prime Minister of India (Rajiv Gandhi), as also Secretary, Ministry of Steel and Ministry of Power, Government of India. Born in the South Indian state of Tamil Nadu, Vasudevan was the holder of master's degrees in Economics from the University of Delhi and in public administration from Harvard University. He died on 25 July 2010. The Government of India honoured him, posthumously, in 2015, with the award of Padma Shri, the fourth highest Indian civilian award.

See also

 Indian Administrative Service

References

Recipients of the Padma Shri in civil service
2010 deaths
Delhi University alumni
Harvard Kennedy School alumni
Indian Administrative Service officers
People from Tamil Nadu
1942 births